The Clouded Silverline, Cigaritis nubilus (sometimes as Aphnaeus nubilus), is a species of lycaenid or blue butterfly. It is endemic to Sri Lanka.

Notes and references

Cigaritis
Butterflies of Sri Lanka
Butterflies described in 1887